Scopula flavorosearia is a moth of the family Geometridae. It is found in Tajikistan.

References

Moths described in 1956
flavorosearia
Moths of Asia